Senecio viscosus is a herbaceous annual plant of the genus Senecio. It is known as the sticky ragwort, sticky groundsel or stinking groundsel.

Description
An annual, growing to 70 cm high and covered with glandular hairs. Very similar to Senecio sylvaticus which does not have glandular hairs. The outer bracts show a brown tip. The ray-florets are ligulate, yellow and at first spreading then rolled back. The leaves are alternate and deeply lobed. Senecio vulgaris (Groundsel) does not have ray florets.

Distribution 
Locally common in Britain and Ireland on waste ground.

References

External links

viscosus
Flora of Great Britain
Plants described in 1753
Taxa named by Carl Linnaeus
Flora of Ireland